Economic and Public Affairs (EPA) is a subject taught in the junior forms of most secondary schools in Hong Kong, either as a separate subject or as a component of combined humanities or combined social studies. The subject is concerned with helping students to develop a basic understanding of economic and political issues, of the economic and political foundations of Hong Kong society, and of their responsibilities and rights as citizens and consumers. In many ways, it is similar to Civics courses which are taught in many other countries, but the syllabus content is almost entirely related to local Hong Kong topics.

Topics 
Topics covered in the EPA syllabus include the following:

Form One:
Rights and duties of Hong Kong residents
The status and immigration rights of Chinese and Non-Chinese, permanent and non-permanent residents
The Demographics of Hong Kong
Transportation in Hong Kong

Form Two:
The Basic Law of Hong Kong and the concept of One Country Two Systems. Hong Kong's autonomy and the Chinese Government's sovereignty.
The structure of the Hong Kong Government
Law and Order in Hong Kong
Hong Kong's Legal System and Judiciary
Education in Hong Kong

Form Three:
Consumer education
The development and features of the economy of Hong Kong
Hong Kong as a trade and finance centre
Visible and invisible trade
Problems faced by industry and their effect upon employment in Hong Kong
The government's role in the economy
Function and responsibilities of mass media

Options after completing EPA 
After studying EPA in Forms One to Three, students who wish to continue exploring the themes covered by the subject can opt to study Economics and Public Affairs and Government and Public Affairs for their HKCEE and HKALE examinations, and to complete the Liberal studies later in Forms Four to Six for the HKDSE (Some secondary school start it earlier - At Form One or Form Two.)

External links 
 Hong Kong Education Bureau

Education in Hong Kong